Dongfeng is a subdistrict of the Yuexiu District in Guangzhou City, Guangdong Province, southern China.

References 

Administrative divisions of Yuexiu District
Subdistricts of the People's Republic of China